Diko Purić (born 2 October 1993) is a Slovenian male volleyball player who plays for Calcit Volley. With the Slovenian national team, he competed in the 2016 FIVB Volleyball World League.

References

External links 
 EuroSport Volleyball Profile
 World of Volley Profile

1993 births
Living people
Slovenian men's volleyball players
Place of birth missing (living people)